Nawada is a city and a municipality in Bihar, India. It is also the headquarters of the Nawada district.
It is the headquarters of the subdivision of the same name, lying on both sides of the Khuri River( also known as Sakri river in some parts) at 24º 53’ N and 85º 33’ E. The name evolved from Nau-wada, meaning the new town. On 26 January 1973, Nawada was formed as a separate district from Gaya.

History
Nawada is a part of the ancient Magadh division of south Bihar.
The origin of the name Nawada is from Sanskrit Nava Avad,  which means "new town" which was earlier known as ‘The Eliot Market (Bazaar)’.
Before its acquisition by the East India Company, Nawada was ruled by the nearly independent Rajas of Hisua who ruled over the Muslim Mayi clan.  After its acquisition, Nawada was in great disorder until 1845, when it became the headquarters of the newly created subdivision. The elements of disorder resurfaced again during the Mutiny of 1857, when Nawada was over run by marauding parties. The local offices were destroyed, but Government records were saved by the native officials who hid them in a cave on a neighboring hill. These are the only available public records dating back to an era before 1857 in the district. Two miles to the north, there is a Jain temple standing in the middle of a large water tank to the west of the public road, but the city itself contains no important building and has little historical interest. The city contains one of the two Satyagraha ashrams in the country established by Gandhi ji. It was also the birthplace and workplace of Indrabhuti Gautama, the Chief disciple of Lord Mahavir in Jainism. The modern town is only 40 kilometers from Nalanda University, the oldest university in the world.

Nawada is southernmost district of Bihar and its neighbouring next state Jharkhand. Over the years when all other districts in Bihar has seen development, Nawada still struggling for basic needs. One of the major problem in district is corruption. Town has enormous encroachment and government authorities are not doing much to keep this city clean and encroachment free. Source (www.nawada.info)

Geography
The city is divided into two blocks by the Khuri River, the left bank being the older section, while the right bank is the modern section with public offices, a sub-jail, dispensary and schools.

Demographics

According to the 2011 census, Nawada City has a population of 109,141. Nawada has a ratio of 957 females for every 1,000 males. The average literacy rate is 74%, higher than the national average of 63.5%: male literacy is 81%, and female literacy is 67%. In Nawada, 17% of the population is under 6 years of age. Hindi, Magahi and Urdu are the main languages spoken in the area.

Rail network
 Patna Railway Station → Gaya Railway Station →  Nawadah Railway station
 New Delhi → Kanpur Central → Prayagraj Jn. → Pt. Deen Dayal Upadhyaya Jn. → Sasaram → Gaya Jn. → Nawadah

Road network
 From Meethapur Bus Stand, Patna or Gandhi Maidan Bus Stand, Patna to Nawada Bus Stand via NH 20.

Air
By air, Nawada is well connected to several airports of Bihar, Jharkhand and West Bengal:

Gaya Airport 
Lok Nayak Jayaprakash Airport, Patna 
Birsa Munda Airport, Ranchi  
Netaji Subhas Chandra Bose International Airport, Kolkata 
Deoghar Airport 167 kilometres (103.769 mi)

Tourist places
Historians believe this place was a reputed religious center for the Hindus in the Palas period. Nawada has a museum of national importance, the Narad Museum, which was established in 1974. Some other significant temples and religious spots within the city are The  Surya Narayana Mandir, Shobhnath Mandir, Sankat Mochan and Gonawa Jal Mandir, dedicated to the first Jain guru.

The Surya Narayana Mandir of Handiya is the earliest and it is supposed to be of Dvapara Yuga. The Surya Narayana Mandir of Handiya was constructed by the King of Magadha Jarasandha. Jarasandha’s daughter Dhaniya was suffering from leprosy, and used to stay at this holy place every day for devotion. The Myth says that she used to bathe in the nearby pond and was cured. Soon after Dhaniya established a place of worship, Maa Bhagwati, in a nearby village, and a Shivalinga at Dhaniya hill, which is just a ways from the main temple .

Handiya is surrounded to the north side by Rajgir Mountain, and to the south by a river. Each year, thousands of people come to visit this holy place. The Surya Narayana Mandir is also known for betel nuts like Magahi Pan.
Apart from these, other tourist places like Kakolat Falls, Bodhgaya, Pawapuri, Nalanda, Kauwakol (Sadakat Ashram) and Rajgir can be reached by traveling on the road within 1–2 hours.
People visit sufi shrines & Dargah of Khawaja Syed Abdullah Chishti Chota Sheikhpura, Hazrat Sarwar Sultan Lakhi Diwan (Hasua), Hazrat Dariya Shaheed ( Ansar Nagar), Hazrat Jalal Bukhari ( Nawada), Hazrat Nemat Shaheed, Bari Dargah, Nawada, Hazrat Sufidullah and two hundred years old Khanquah Afzalia Faridia Asdaqiah at Sherpur, Nawada and centuries old (in the reign of akbar) Khanquah Chishtia at Chota Sheikhpura, Narhat, Nawada.

References

Nawada district
Cities and towns in Nawada district